Evil Heat is the seventh studio album by Scottish rock band Primal Scream. It was first released on 5 August 2002 in the United Kingdom by Columbia Records and on 26 November 2002 in the United States by Epic Records. It peaked at number 9 on the UK Albums Chart. Musically, its style forms a link between two of the band's previous albums: the aggressive protest of XTRMNTR (2000), and the acid house psychedelia of Screamadelica (1991).

Composition
The track "Rise" was originally titled "Bomb the Pentagon", and debuted as part of the band's live set in summer 2001. In light of the 11 September 2001 attacks, both the lyrics and title of the song were reworked, and the revised version appears on the album. "Space Blues #2", written and performed solely by Martin Duffy, is a follow-up to "Space Blues", a song by his previous band Felt.

Critical reception

At Metacritic, which assigns a weighted average score out of 100 to reviews from mainstream critics, the album received an average score of 68, based on 24 reviews, indicating "generally favorable reviews".

Playlouder ranked the album at number 35 on their list of the top 50 albums of 2002.

Track listing

Personnel
Credits adapted from liner notes.

Primal Scream
 Bobby Gillespie – vocals, guitar, programming
 Andrew Innes – guitar
 Robert Young – guitar, programming
 Martin Duffy – keyboards, programming, samples
 Gary 'Mani' Mounfield – bass
 Darrin Mooney – drums, programming

Additional musicians
 Jim Reid – lead vocals (4)
 Kate Moss – additional vocals (8)
 Robert Plant – harmonica (6)
 Kevin Shields – guitar effects (7)
 Paul Harte – guitar effects (9)
 Phil Mossman – harmonica (2)
 Darren Morris – synthesizer (5)
 Chris Mackin – bass guitar (3)
 Marco Nelson – harmony voice (3)
 Brendan Lynch – synthesizer (7)

Charts

References

External links
 

2002 albums
Primal Scream albums
Columbia Records albums
Albums produced by Kevin Shields